Plouha (Gallo: Plóha) is a town and commune in the Côtes-d'Armor department of Brittany in northwestern France.

Population

Inhabitants of Plouha are called plouhatins in French.

Twin towns
Plouha is twinned with:
  Killorglin in County Kerry, Ireland, since 1999
  Palas de Rei in Spain since 2003
  Seix in France since 2013

History
Plouha has many notable medieval sites ranging from chapels and churches to manoires and kers, including The Chapel of Kermaria (Kermaria an Iskuit).

World War II
Plouha's beaches were the sight of several resistance efforts, notably as part of the Comet line, a resistance group that sheltered Allied troops and helped them return to Great Britain. The Bonaparte beach near Plouha was the site for the evacuations by sea organized by the Shelburne Escape Line and residents of Plouha. In 1944, more than 100 downed allied airmen were evacuated by Royal Navy motor gunboats from Bonaparte Beach to Dartmouth, England.

See also
Communes of the Côtes-d'Armor department

References

External links

Official website 

Communes of Côtes-d'Armor